Helgason is a surname of Icelandic origin, meaning son of Helgi. In Icelandic names, the name is not strictly a surname, but a patronymic. The name may refer to:

Agnar Helgason (born 1968), Icelandic scientist; researcher in genetic anthropology
Árni Helgason (1260–1320), Icelandic Roman Catholic clergyman; Bishop of Iceland 1304–20
Asgeir Helgason (born 1975), Icelandic scientist; working in Sweden
Auðun Helgason (born 1974), Icelandic professional football player
Einarr Helgason (fl. 10th century), Icelandic skald (Old Norse poet)
Hallgrímur Helgason (born 1959), Icelandic artist and author
Jóhannes Helgason (born 1958), Icelandic guitar player and airline pilot
 Jón Helgason (poet) (1899–1986), Icelandic philologist and poet
 Jón Helgason (minister) (born 1931), Icelandic politician and former minister
Sigurdur Helgason (airline executive), Icelandic airline innovator
Sigurdur Helgason (mathematician), Icelandic mathematician
Tomrair mac Ailchi (Thorir Helgason), tenth-century Viking king of Limerick
Halldor Helgason (born 1991), Icelandic professional snowboarder

Surnames
Icelandic-language surnames